Kris Deedigan is a British actor best known for his portrayal of Des Townsend in the long-running Channel 4 soap opera Hollyoaks.

Career
Deedigan's first main role was playing Des in soap opera, Hollyoaks which he began filming in 2009. In 2010 his character was axed from the series after producer Paul Marquess conducted a cast cull. Deedigan also contributed to Hollyoak's charity single, 'Sing for England' which is released in 2010.

Kris also starred in an episode of Coronation Street as the man who knocked over Sophie.

References

External links
 
 https://www.youtube.com/watch?v=DGYJ8t_7iBY&feature=mfu_in_order&list=UL 
 https://www.youtube.com/watch?v=7-6I7MKYWI0&feature=mfu_in_order&list=UL

Living people
English male soap opera actors
1979 births